Kogo can refer to:

Kogo, an alternate name for the town of Cogo, Equatorial Guinea
Kogo, a town in Ouargaye Department, Koulpélogo Province, Burkina Faso
Kogo, the name of several towns in Nigeria
Kōgō (empress), the Japanese name for empress consorts
Kōgō (incense box),  an incense box used in Japanese tea ceremony
KOGO (AM), a talk radio station in San Diego, California, United States
KSSX, a radio station (95.7 FM) licensed to serve Carlsbad, California, United States, which held the call sign KOGO-FM from 2011 to 2013
Kogo Kingdom, a former polity in the area of Faskari, Katsina, Nigeria
Kogo Shūi, a historical record of the Inbe clan of Japan
5684 Kogo, a Main-belt Asteroid

People named Kogo include:

Benjamin Kogo, a Kenyan steeplechase runner
, Japanese screenwriter
Micah Kogo, a Kenyan long-distance runner

Japanese masculine given names
Kenyan names